Abílio António Gomes Novais (born 24 August 1967), known simply as Abílio as a player, is a Portuguese retired footballer who played as an attacking midfielder, and the current manager of Vila FC.

Over the course of 13 seasons, he amassed Primeira Liga totals of 342 matches and 46 goals, mainly at Salgueiros.

Club career
Born in Vila Nova de Gaia, Porto District, Abílio competed in the Primeira Liga from 1988 to 2001, starting by playing all 38 games for Leixões S.C. as the season ended in relegation. He nonetheless signed for FC Porto, being rarely used during his tenure and subsequently joining S.C. Salgueiros. 

Abílio scored 26 league goals for Salgueiros in his last four years combined, then moved to S.C. Campomaiorense and C.D. Aves, retiring in 2003 at the age of 36 with first club Leixões, in the third division. He subsequently started working as a manager.

Personal life
Novais' son, João, was also a footballer and a midfielder. He too played for Leixões.

References

External links

1967 births
Living people
Sportspeople from Vila Nova de Gaia
Portuguese footballers
Association football midfielders
Primeira Liga players
Liga Portugal 2 players
Segunda Divisão players
U.D. Oliveirense players
C.F. União de Lamas players
Leixões S.C. players
FC Porto players
S.C. Salgueiros players
C.F. Os Belenenses players
S.C. Campomaiorense players
C.D. Aves players
Portuguese football managers
Liga Portugal 2 managers
Leixões S.C. managers
Varzim S.C. managers